Red Point is the seventh EP recorded and performed by the South Korean idol group Teen Top. It was released on January 18, 2016 with "Warning Sign" serving as the album's title track. The album was released in two versions, 'Chic' and 'Urban' and contains six tracks in total. It was the last album to feature L.Joe before his departure on February 10, 2017.

Track listing

Charts

References

2016 EPs
Teen Top albums